Stephen Webb (born April 30, 1975) is a Canadian former professional ice hockey player. He was picked in the seventh round of the 1994 draft by the Buffalo Sabres. In his eight seasons with the NHL, he played for the New York Islanders and Pittsburgh Penguins.

Webb became a fan favorite during the 2001–02 season with the New York Islanders for a number of hard open-ice checks he delivered on opposing players, including Theoren Fleury of the New York Rangers.  In the playoffs, Webb established himself with a number of hard hits on numerous Toronto Maple Leafs players.  At one point during the playoffs, he made a huge hit on Toronto forward Darcy Tucker seen as retribution for Tucker injuring Isles captain Michael Peca in the previous game.

Steve Webb was the recipient of the Bob Nystrom award in 2002 for the Islander that best exemplifies hard work, leadership, and dedication on and off the ice.  He is the Assistant Coach of the Long Island Royals, a team in the Atlantic Metropolitan Hockey League located in Kings Park, New York and runs a charitable outreach organization for kids called the W20 Foundation.

Playing career
Webb lived and played hockey in Milton, Ontario until age 12, when he moved to Peterborough. He bought a home in Milton while playing. Webb played junior hockey for three seasons in the Ontario Hockey League with the Windsor Spitfires and Peterborough Petes. Webb then split a season between the Muskegon Fury of the Colonial Hockey League and the Detroit Vipers of the International Hockey League. Webb finally made it to the NHL with the New York Islanders. He split that season with the Islanders American Hockey League affiliate, the Kentucky Thoroughblades. Webb split the next season between the same two teams. In the next season, he played for both the Islanders and their new AHL affiliate, the Lowell Lock Monsters. Webb then played the next four seasons solely for the Islanders before moving on to the Pittsburgh Penguins. His signing with the Penguins didn't go quite as planned, as Webb was sent down to the Penguins AHL affiliate, the Wilkes-Barre/Scranton Penguins. Webb was traded back to the Islanders, but played a few games with their AHL affiliate, the Bridgeport Sound Tigers. Webb finished off the season back with the Islanders before retiring.

Career statistics

References

External links
Yahoo statistics
 

1975 births
Bridgeport Sound Tigers players
Buffalo Sabres draft picks
Canadian ice hockey right wingers
Detroit Vipers players
Sportspeople from Peterborough, Ontario
Kentucky Thoroughblades players
Living people
Lowell Lock Monsters players
New York Islanders players
Peterborough Petes (ice hockey) players
Pittsburgh Penguins players
Wilkes-Barre/Scranton Penguins players
Windsor Spitfires players
Ice hockey people from Ontario